William Tilford Otey (December 16, 1886 – April 22, 1931) was a pitcher in Major League Baseball. He played for the Pittsburgh Pirates and Washington Senators.

References

External links

1886 births
1931 deaths
Major League Baseball pitchers
Pittsburgh Pirates players
Washington Senators (1901–1960) players
Baseball players from Dayton, Ohio
Norfolk Tars players
Roanoke Tigers players
Rochester Bronchos players
Wheeling Stogies players
Dayton Veterans players